EqWorld is  a free online mathematics reference site that lists information about mathematical equations.

It covers ordinary differential, partial differential, integral, functional, and other mathematical equations. It also outlines some methods for solving equations, and lists many resources for solving equations, and has an  equation archive which users can add to.

References
Science, 2005, Vol 308, Issue 5727, p. 1387.
Physics Today, July 2005, p. 35.
A. D. Polyanin and A. V. Manzhirov, Handbook of Integral Equations,  Chapman & Hall/CRC Press  1998. xxvi+787 pp. .

External links
EqWorld home page

Mathematics websites
Equations
Multilingual websites